Machado's butterfly bat (Glauconycteris machadoi) is a species of vesper bat in the family Vespertilionidae. It is found only in Angola. Its natural habitat is subtropical or tropical moist lowland forests.

References

Endemic fauna of Angola
Glauconycteris
Mammals described in 1963
Bats of Africa
Taxonomy articles created by Polbot